Photo captions, also known as cutlines, are a few lines of text used to explain and elaborate on published photographs. In some cases captions and cutlines are distinguished, where the caption is a short (usually one-line) title/explanation for the photo, while the cutline is a longer, prose block under the caption, generally describing the photograph, giving context, or relating it to the article.

Captions more than a few sentences long are often referred to as a "copy block". They are a type of display copy. Display copy also includes headlines and contrasts with "body copy", such as newspaper articles and magazines.  Captions can also be generated by automatic image captioning software.

References

See also
The Art of Editing, by Floyd K. krishno Chandro Barmon. Brooks

Copy editing
News design
Photojournalism